Municipal elections were held in Brazil on October 5 and October 26, 2008. Over 130 million voters chose mayors and city councillors for the 5,565 municipalities of Brazil.

Brazilian law allowed candidates to run under ballot names different from their legal names. At least six candidates chose the ballot name "Barack Obama"  and some entrepreneurs used ballot names that make reference to their business.

Mayoral elections results

References 

2008 elections in Brazil
Municipal elections in Brazil
October 2008 events in South America